Sir David William Smith, 1st Baronet (September 4, 1764 – May 9, 1837) was a soldier and political figure in Upper Canada.

He was born in Salisbury, England in 1764. He was the only son of Colonel John Smith (d.1795) and his wife Anne, daughter of William Waylen of Rowde Hill and Devizes, Wiltshire. He joined his father's regiment, the 5th Regiment of Foot, as an ensign in 1779. He married his first wife in 1788 and rejoined the regiment under his father's command at Detroit in 1790. He served on the land board in the Hesse District in 1791 and 1792. Lieutenant Governor John Graves Simcoe made him acting deputy surveyor general in 1792.  He was appointed surveyor general of Upper Canada in 1798.

In 1792, he was elected to the 1st Parliament of Upper Canada representing Suffolk & Essex. Although there were no other candidates, Smith authorized 200 pounds be spent to entertain electors on voting day.
In 1796, he was elected in the 3rd riding of Lincoln. He became a member of the Executive Council of Upper Canada in 1796. In 1800, he was elected again to the Legislative Assembly representing Norfolk, Oxford & Middlesex. Smith was speaker for the Legislative Assembly from 1796 to 1801.

David Smith acquired 20,000 acres of land in Ontario and owned the park lot which contained the Moss Park estate. He actually owned half of the original land that contained the original city of Toronto. He wrote, “A Short Topographical Description of His Majesty's Province of Upper Canada in North America, to which is annexed a Provincial Gazeteer.” The original work was compiled at the request of Simcoe and republished in London in 1813.

In 1802, he returned to England and, in 1804, resigned from his appointments in Upper Canada. He began a second career as property manager for the Duke of Northumberland. He was made a baronet in 1821. He died near Alnwick, Northumberland in 1837.

References

1764 births
1837 deaths
Royal Northumberland Fusiliers officers
Smith, David William, 1st Baronet
Canadian baronets recommended by the British government
Members of the Legislative Assembly of Upper Canada
People from Salisbury
Speakers of the Legislative Assembly of Upper Canada
English emigrants to pre-Confederation Ontario
Immigrants to Upper Canada
Canadian slave owners